Laurel Lisa Holloman is an American painter and actress. She is best known for playing Tina Kennard in The L Word.

Early life
Holloman is the youngest child in her family. She has two older brothers. She graduated from Saint Mary's School, an Episcopal boarding school for girls in Raleigh, in 1986. She attended the University of North Carolina where she graduated with a degree in Performance Communication. She appeared in numerous theater productions in Chapel Hill and Raleigh, as well as in Chicago and London. She studied painting and sculpting at UCLA and at The San Francisco Art Institute.

Career

Acting
After graduating from UNC, Holloman moved to Chicago to work with the Piven Theatre Workshop. She studied with John Lynn in Los Angeles, and was cast in David Orr's independent feature Blossom Time. She moved to New York City in early 1994 and appeared in stage productions such as Tennessee Williams' The Glass Menagerie, Carson McCullers' The Heart Is a Lonely Hunter at the Theatre for the New City. Holloman also performed off-Broadway in Julia Jordan's Night Swim at Playwright's Horizons.

In 1995, Holloman began her film career with her role as Randy Dean in The Incredibly True Adventure of Two Girls in Love. She worked steadily in a variety of mostly independent film roles, such as The Myth of Fingerprints, Boogie Nights and Tumbleweeds.

Though she retired from acting to pursue a career in painting, she returned to reprise the role of the series' follow-up, The L Word: Generation Q.

Painting

After her acting career, Holloman spent her time painting in Los Angeles. Her paintings were influenced by Mark Rothko, with vibrant use of color and large scale pieces, as well as elements of three dimensional effect. Although mostly abstract, Holloman's paintings betray a distinctly literary spirituality. She received favorable reviews for Free Falling, which was held at the Ateneo Veneto in Venice, Italy. Art critic Lea Mattarella reviewed Holloman's works in La Repubblica: "Holloman's paintings take us elsewhere, and at the end of the day, this is what art is all about".

Holloman's  painting, "Swell", was chosen to be part of the group show entitled "Nell' Acqua Capisco" at the Venice Biennale, 2013. She won 1st Place in Discipline Painting at the 2014 Contemporary Art Biennale of Argentina. Holloman had two entries in the 2015 Florence Biennale and won a prize for "Into the Woods". In November 2015 she had a solo show at the Menier Gallery in London titled "The Innocents". Holloman's first solo museum show entitled "Everglow" was held in Amstelveen, Netherlands from July 2016 through August 2016 in the Museum Jan Van der Togt.

Personal life
Holloman married architect Paul Macherey on July 13, 2002. They have a daughter, Lola Reiko Macherey. They adopted a second daughter, Nala Belle (meaning 'beautiful gift'). In 2011, Holloman filed for divorce, which was finalized on June 18, 2012.

Exhibitions

Solo exhibitions
2017
 Fertile Ground, Bankside Gallery, London

2016
 Everglow, Museum Jan van der Togt, Amstelveen

2015
 The Innocents, Mernier Gallery, London

2014
 The Fifth Element, Galerie Joseph, Paris

2013
 All the World Inside, Palazzo Italia, Berlin

2012
 Free Falling, Ateneo of Venice, Venice
 Coeur Libre, Pantheon Town Hall, Paris.

Filmography

Film

Television

References

External links
 Laurel Holloman Art
 

Living people
20th-century American painters
21st-century American painters
American film actresses
American stage actresses
American television actresses
Actresses from North Carolina
Bisexual actresses
American LGBT actors
LGBT people from North Carolina
People from Chapel Hill, North Carolina
University of North Carolina at Chapel Hill alumni
American women painters
20th-century American women artists
21st-century American women artists
St. Mary's School (North Carolina) alumni
Year of birth missing (living people)